Thomas William Cumberland was an English footballer who played in the Football League for Lincoln City as a goalkeeper.

Career statistics

References 

English footballers
Brentford F.C. players
English Football League players
1882 births
Year of death missing
Footballers from Derby
Association football goalkeepers
Lincoln City F.C. players
Ashfield United F.C. players
Date of birth missing